The   was a jin'ya built in the Edo period located in the city of Mooka, Tochigi Prefecture in the northern Kantō region of Japan. It was designated a National Historic Site of Japan in 1932.

Overview
Under the Edo period Tokugawa shogunate, Odawara Domain in Sagami Province was controlled by the Ōkubo clan.  As with most domains in the han system, Odawara Domain consisted of several discontinuous territories calculated to provide its assigned kokudaka, and one of these holdings was a 4000 koku fief in Shimotsuke Province. The daimyō of Odawara, Ōkubo Tadatomo and constructed a fortified residence the following year for his third son to administer this exclave.

Originally, the jin'ya was a complex of 12-13 buildings with a large office, warehouses and stables, all surrounded by an earthen rampart.

Over time, due to poor farming practices and neglect, the lands of the Ōkubo holding became exhausted, with its yield dropping to less than 1000 koku. In 1823, Ōkubo Tadazane dispatched the noted scholar and agrarian reformer Ninomiya Sontoku to the territory in an attempt to restore it to productivity. Ninomiya spent 26 years at this location, implementing his theories of agrarian management, and was able to restore the territory to its former prosperity.

After the Meiji restoration, the jin'ja was abolished, and its surviving structures were destroyed, with the exception of the current single thatch-roof building and a fragment of the earthenworks on its south side.

The jin'ya is located about 10 minutes on foot from Kugeta Station on the Mooka Railway.

See also
List of Historic Sites of Japan (Tochigi)

References

External links

Ninomiya Sontoku Museum 
Tochigi Prefecture tourism home page 
Mooka city home page 

Edo period
Mooka, Tochigi
Historic Sites of Japan
History of Tochigi Prefecture
Museums in Tochigi Prefecture
17th-century establishments in Japan
Buildings and structures completed in 1699